The Chicago Tribune Heartland Prize is a literary prize created in 1988 by the newspaper The Chicago Tribune. It is awarded yearly in two categories: Fiction and Nonfiction. These prizes are awarded to books that "reinforce and perpetuate the values of heartland America."

Chicago Tribune Heartland Prize — Fiction 
2019: Rebecca Makkai for  The Great Believers 
2018: George Saunders, for Lincoln in the Bardo
2017: Colson Whitehead, for The Underground Railroad
2016: Jane Smiley, for Golden Age
2015: Chang-rae Lee, for On Such a Full Sea
2014: Daniel Woodrell, for The Maid's Version
2013: Chimamanda Ngozi Adichie, for Americanah
2012:  Richard Ford, for Canada
 2011:  Jonathan Franzen, for Freedom
2010:  E. O. Wilson, for Anthill
2009:  Jayne Anne Phillips, for Lark and Termite
2008:  Aleksandar Hemon, for The Lazarus Project
2007:  Robert Olmstead, for Coal Black Horse
2006:  Louise Erdrich, for The Painted Drum
2005:  Marilynne Robinson, for Gilead
2004:  Ward Just, for An Unfinished Season
2003:  Scott Turow, for Reversible Errors
2002:  Alice Sebold, for The Lovely Bones
2001:  Mona Simpson, for  Off Keck Road
2000:  Jeffery Renard Allen, for Rails Under My Back
1999:  Elizabeth Strout, for Amy and Isabelle
1998:  Jane Hamilton, for The Short History of a Prince
1997:  Charles Frazier, for Cold Mountain
1996:  Antonya Nelson, for Talking in Bed
1995:  William Maxwell, for All The Days and Nights
1994:  Maxine Clair, for Rattlebone
1993:  Annie Proulx, for The Shipping News
1992:  Jane Smiley, for A Thousand Acres
1991:  Kaye Gibbons, for A Cure For Dreams
1990:  Tim O'Brien, for The Things They Carried
1989:  Ward Just, for Jack Gance
1988:  Eric Larsen, for An American Memory

Chicago Tribune Heartland Prize — Nonfiction 
2019: Sarah Smarsh, for Heartland: A Memoir of Working Hard and Being Broke in the Richest Country on Earth
2018: Caroline Fraser, for Prairie Fires: The American Dreams of Laura Ingalls Wilder
2017: Matthew Desmond, for Evicted: Poverty and Profit in the American City
2016: Margo Jefferson, for Negroland: A Memoir 
2015: Danielle Allen, for Our Declaration: A Reading of the Declaration of Independence in Defense of Equality
2014: Jesmyn Ward, for Men We Reaped
2013: Thomas Dyja, for The Third Coast: When Chicago Built the American Dream
2012:  Paul Hendrickson, for Hemingway's Boat: Everything He Loved in Life, and Lost, 1934-1961
 2011:  Isabel Wilkerson, for The Warmth of Other Suns
2010:  Rebecca Skloot for The Immortal Life of Henrietta Lacks
2009:  Nick Reding, for Methland: The Death and Life of an American Small Town
2008:  Garry Wills, for Head and Heart: American Christianities and What the Gospels Meant
2007:  Orville Vernon Burton, for The Age of Lincoln
2006:  Taylor Branch, for At Canaan's Edge: America in the King Years, 1965-1968
2005:  Kevin Boyle, for Arc of Justice: A Saga of Race, Civil Rights, and Murder in the Jazz Age
2004:  Ann Patchett, for Truth and Beauty: A Friendship
2003:  Paul Hendrickson, for Sons of Mississippi: A Story of Race and Its Legacy
2002:  Studs Terkel, for Will the Circle Be Unbroken?: Reflections on Death, Rebirth, and Hunger for a Faith
2001:  Louis Menand, for The Metaphysical Club: A Story of Ideas in America
2000:  Zachary Karabell, for The Last Campaign: How Harry Truman Won the 1948 Election
1999: Jay Parini for Robert Frost: A Life
1998:  Alex Kotlowitz, for The Other Side of the River: A Story of Two Towns, A Death, and America's Dilemma
1997:  Thomas Lynch, for The Undertaking: Life Studies from the Dismal Trade
1996:  Jonathan Harr, for A Civil Action
1995:  Richard Stern, for A Sistermony
1994:  Henry Louis Gates, Jr., for Colored People: A Memoir
1993:  Norman Maclean, for Young Men and Fire
1992:  Melissa Fay Greene, for Praying for Sheetrock: A Work of Non-Fiction
1991:  William Cronon, for Nature's Metropolis: Chicago and the Great West
1990:  Michael Dorris, for The Broken Cord: A Family's Ongoing Struggle with Fetal Alcohol Syndrome
1989:  Joseph Epstein, for Partial Payments: Essays on Writers and Their Lives
1988:  Don Katz, for The Big Store: Inside the Crisis and Revolution at Sears

References 

1988 establishments in Illinois
American fiction awards
American non-fiction literary awards
Awards established in 1988
Chicago Tribune
Literary awards by magazines and newspapers